Pristurus celerrimus, also known as the Oman rock gecko or bar-tailed semaphore gecko, is a species of lizard in the Sphaerodactylidae family found in Oman and the United Arab Emirates.

References

Pristurus
Reptiles described in 1977